Brigadier General Sławomir Petelicki (13 September 1946 – 16 June 2012) was the first commander of the  Polish special forces unit GROM from July 13, 1990, until December 19, 1995. Later, he was the head of the Foundation of Former GROM Soldiers.

Biography
Sławomir Petelicki was born September 13, 1946 in Warsaw. In 1969 he graduated from the Law Faculty of the Warsaw University. The same year he joined the I Department (Intelligence) Ministry of Internal Affairs of People's Republic of Poland and, until 1990, he served at various posts in the intelligence service. On various posts in Polish embassies abroad he was responsible for counter-intelligence. Since 1973 a military advisor at the Polish consulate in New York. Upon his return to Poland he continued his service in the economical intelligence. After a brief stay in Sweden between 1983 and 1987, where he served as the head of the Polish intelligence in the embassy in Stockholm, he returned to Poland where he was assigned to the Ministry of Foreign Affairs as the commanding officer of all the security services guarding Polish embassies and consulates. 

Apart from his intelligence service, Petelicki was also an active member of special forces. He gained extensive experience in reconnaissance and diversion. Very little is known of the missions he was part of, apart from the missions to North Vietnam in 1971 and to China the following year.

In 1990 Petelicki was assigned to a newly formed, then top secret JW 2305 special forces. Initially consisting only of himself, the unit was soon expanded to become GROM. For the first several years the unit remained completely secret. It was first reported to the press in 1992 and became known to the public in 1994, after their first major military operation in Haiti. Dismissed on December 19, 1995, Petelicki remained unassigned. 

Between May 14 and June 13 of 1996, Petelicki was the deputy Prime Minister for fighting organized crime. On December 7, 1997 he was again assigned as the commanding officer of the GROM unit. On August 15, 1998, the Day of the Polish Army, he was promoted by president Aleksander Kwaśniewski to the rank of brigadier general. On September 17, 1999 he finally gave up the command of GROM and retired. Thereafter, he headed the Foundation of Former GROM Soldiers, which helps veterans to meld into society.

In his later years he openly criticized the Polish Government and condemned Polish president Bronisław Komorowski. He was considered a hero by various right-wing groups because of similarities in their beliefs. He also accused Polish premier Donald Tusk of high treason.

Death 
On June 16, 2012, Petelicki's wife found his body lying next to his car parked in the garage of their apartment block in Warsaw. According to the police, Petelicki died from a self-inflicted gunshot to his head. Apart from the bullet entrance and exit wounds in his temples, no other injuries were found on his body, and security cameras did not record the presence of any other people in the garage at the time of his death, leading the police to conclude that Petelicki had committed suicide. He has left no suicide note.

Awards
During his military career, Sławomir Petelicki was awarded with some of the most notable military medals, including the following:

 Order of Polonia Restituta, Commanders' Cross (1995)
 Order of Polonia Restituta, Officers' Cross
 Order of Polonia Restituta, Knights' Cross
 Cross of Merit for Bravery (1995)
 Golden Cross of Merit
 Silver Cross of Merit
 Golden Medal of Merit for National Defence
 Silver Medal of Merit for National Defence
 Officer of the Legion of Merit (USA)
 Army Commendation Medal (USA)
 Air Assault Badge (USA)

In addition, Petelicki was an honorary member of the 5th and 10th Special Forces Groups of the American "Green Berets" and a bearer of the Golden GROM Badge with Wreath. During his career he accomplished parachute, sniper and diver training. He also gained the I dan in Judo and was a specialist in helicopter landing. Popular among the journalists and mass media, Petelicki was also awarded with the title of Gentleman of the Year 2000 by the Gentleman monthly.

See also
Polish Army

References

External links
Picture of Petelicki with the commander of Delta Force
Picture of Petelicki as general in 1999

1946 births
2012 deaths
Polish generals
Officers of the Legion of Merit
Commanders of the Order of Polonia Restituta
Recipients of the Gold Cross of Merit (Poland)
Suicides by firearm in Poland